Medeniyyet TV ( — "Culture TV") is an Azerbaijani government-owned TV channel showcasing culture in Azerbaijan.

Broadcast area
, 99.96% of the population of Azerbaijan is able to receive Medeniyyet TV via terrestrial, cable, or satellite broadcasting, giving it the largest coverage area of any Azerbaijani television channel.

References

Television networks in Azerbaijan
Azerbaijani-language television stations
Television stations in Azerbaijan
Television channels and stations established in 2011
2011 establishments in Azerbaijan